John F. Germany Public Library is the flagship library of the Tampa-Hillsborough County Public Library System (THPL), as well as a member of the Hillsborough County Public Library Cooperative, and a member of the Tampa Bay Library Consortium.

Located in Downtown Tampa, Florida, the 140,000 sq. ft. library acts as the central reference and resource center for THPL, as well as the local library branch. John F. Germany Library is the largest in the THPL System and houses several special collections.

The library features a creative space known as the HIVE and has various special collections including a Florida History collection, Genealogy Collection, and more than 20,000 photographs in the Burgert Brothers Collection.

The library also features a children's play area and the Realia Collection with more than 470 models, tools, and learning aids available for checkout.

History

Carnegie Library

In 1912, the City of Tampa received a grant from the Carnegie Foundation to start development on a building for a main Tampa library on Seventh Avenue. Architect Fred J. James designed the building, and the physical work was completed on the facility on June 30, 1915. However, the opening of the facility was delayed for two years due to funding constraints. On April 17, 1917, the Tampa Public Library opened to the public with a collection of 3,800 books.

The Carnegie building on Seventh Avenue served as the main library's building until the need for a larger building became a necessity with the increase of population in Tampa to 400,000 people. The Tampa City Council, along with community aid, began plans for a new building. The new building, located less than one mile away from the original Carnegie building, began in 1965 and is still in use today.

New library and name change to John F. Germany
The new Tampa Public Library opened to the public on April 21, 1968. Designed by architectural firms McLane, Ranon, McIntosh & Bernardo, and McElvy & Jennewein, the new facility was 100,000 sq. ft. and held more than 500,000 books. Nine years later, a new 50,000 sq. ft addition was made to the original building. Designed by architectural firm McElvy, Jennewein, Stefany & Howard, the new addition was connected to the original building by an elevated glass walkway. This addition was dedicated on May 23, 1976.

The Tampa Public Library was renamed on November 1, 1999, to the John F. Germany Public Library in honor of library supporter, civic leader, and former judge, John F. Germany. In the 1960s, Germany was chairman of the Friends of the Library Organization while a sitting Hillsborough County circuit judge. After looking over the city budget he goes to the mayor to use funds from cigarette taxes to pay for the expansion plan. He once called the downtown library on Ashley Street his most significant accomplishment. It was there in February 2015, former John F. Germany Public Library Chief Director Andrew S. Breidenbaugh was named director of the Tampa-Hillsborough County Public Library System.

The HIVE
Opened to the public on November 15, 2014, The HIVE is a 10,000 sq. ft. public community Makerspace located on the third floor of the West Building of the John F. Germany Public Library.

UPDATE: In the beginning of 2018, the building that connects the William F. Poe Parking Garage to the Germany Library was closed and given back to the city of Tampa. The HIVE makerspace is now inside the Germany Library. It is located to the right of the building's main entrance on Ashley Drive.

The Media:scape is a collaborative workspace featuring seating for 12 and a 42-inch display monitor with VGA, HDMI, and mini connectors.
The Makerspace is a community workspace for building, tinkering, fabricating, and creating. Equipment includes two Makerbot Replicator 3D printers, Arduino Uno Boards & Accessories, Raspberry Pi kits, Little Bits Deluxe kits, Shapeoko 2 CNC milling machine, and work stations featuring hand tools, soldering irons, and glue guns.
The Robotics Center is a workspace and scrimmage zone for school teams participating in FIRST, VEX, BEST, or any variety of robotics programs.
The Arts Center is a space to work on all things arts and crafts, including painting, drawing, sculpting, scrapbooking, screenprinting, sewing, knitting, quilting, and embroidery. Equipment includes Singer sewing machines, Singer sergers, a Brother embroidery machine, an Accuquilt Go! fabric cutter, a Silhouette Cameo paper and vinyl cutter, and other sewing tools.
The Recording Studio is a space available for booking equipment for recording and editing audio/video projects. Equipment includes a 27-inch iMac, a Chromakey green screen, a Canon camera with tripod, Behringer Mixer, wireless microphones, headphones, and more.
The Flexspace is a multi-use space with seating for fifty, dual projectors with VGA and HDMI, tables, and whiteboards.

Special Collections and Attributes 
The Germany Library offers Art exhibits, STEAM (Science, Technology, Engineering, Art and Mathematics) activities, training or classes. The Germany Library also participates in Fourth Friday. This is a Tampa initiative to have people of the community to interact with what is offered in Downtown Tampa. 
Florida History & Genealogy Library

More external links
 Florida History and Genealogy Library Blog (last updated November 2014)

References

Public libraries in Florida
Federal depository libraries
Government buildings completed in 1968
1968 establishments in Florida
Photo archives in the United States